Sibusiso Mash Mashiloane is a South African jazz musician. He is a pianist, composer, educator, arranger and award winner  who studied jazz at the University of KwaZulu-Natal.

Biography
Mashiloane was born in Bethal. He started playing music in church and went on to study music professionally. He has a Masters in Jazz Performance and graduated from the University of KwaZulu-Natal. His albums include Amanz' Olwandle (2016) and Rotha – A Tribute to Mama (2017). Amanz' Olwandle won two Mzantsi Jazz Awards for Best Jazz album. Rotha was nominated for the Afrima Awards for best Best African Jazz. He lectures at the University of KwaZulu-Natal and Durban Music School. His intent is to teach and organize live music performances with his students, focusing on South African composers.

Discography
 Amanz' Olwandle - 2016
 Rotha - A Tribute to Mama - 2017
 Closer to Home - 2018
 Amanzi Nemifula : Umkhuleko  - 2020
 Ihubo Labomdabu - 2021
 Music from my People - 2022

Awards
Amanz' Olwandle – Mzantsi Jazz Awards 2017– 2 Awards for Best Jazz Album, public vote and jury.
Rotha - All Africa Music Awards 2018 – nominated for Best African Jazz and Best Male in Southern Africa.

References

Living people
South African musicians
South African pianists
1984 births
21st-century pianists
South African jazz pianists
African jazz (genre) pianists